Dihammaphora ibirijarai' is a species of beetle in the family Cerambycidae. It was described by Mermudes in 1998.

References

Dihammaphora
Beetles described in 1998